Land Administration Training Centre is a government training academy under the Ministry of Land responsible for training land administration officers of the Bangladesh Civil Service. It is located in Katabon, Dhaka, Bangladesh.

History
Land Administration Training Centre was established in 1997 by the government of Bangladesh to train land officers of the Bangladesh Civil Service.

References

1997 establishments in Bangladesh
Organisations based in Dhaka
Government agencies of Bangladesh
Government departments of Bangladesh